Freebird Games is a video game developer from Canada. They have developed eight games. Their most prominent game, To the Moon, was nominated for Best Writing and Innovation Award for the Canadian Videogame Awards.

History 
Freebird Games started as a personal project made by Kan Gao. Later the team expanded to include help from Jessica M. Vázquez, James Q. Zhang (retired), Gabriela Aprile, and Lannie Neely III. Kan commissions various talents for resources and labor, but the majority of the work is completed by him as the only "official" developer.

The first game developed by Freebird Games is Quintessence: The Blighted Venom, an incompleted free episodic interactive drama role-playing game. Their second free game Do You Remember My Lullaby? was released on December 21, 2008. On June 20, 2009 they released a free demo of an upcoming release titled Lyra's Melody - The Song She Whispered to Me. In 2011, shortly before the release of To The Moon, they released their first full game The Mirror Lied for free. It is described as an abstract short story. Their first commercial release to the first installment of Sigmund Corp Series, To The Moon, was released on November 1, 2011, was a commercial success and received positive reviews. To the Moon's two minisodes were released on late-2013 and early-2015, and its sequel, Finding Paradise, was released on December 14, 2017 for Microsoft Windows, Mac OS X and Linux. It has also released positive reviews. Freebird's latest game, Impostor Factory, released on the 30th of September, 2021.

Games

External links 

 Official website

References

Video game companies established in 2007
Canadian companies established in 2007
Video game companies of Canada